Fideline Ngoy Mudimbi (born 31 March 1991), known as Fideline Ngoy, is a DR Congolese footballer who plays as a goalkeeper for Turkish Women's Football Super League club Adana İdman Yurdu and captains the DR Congo women's national team.

Club career 
Ngoy has played for Force Terrestre and Amani in the Democratic Republic of the Congo and for Progresso Associação do Sambizanga in Angola.

She moved to Turkey mid November 2022, and signed with Adana İdman Yurdu to play in the 2022–23 Women's Super League.

International career 
Ngoy capped for the DR Congo at senior level during the 2012 African Women's Championship.

See also 
 List of Democratic Republic of the Congo women's international footballers

References

External links 

1991 births
Living people
Footballers from Kinshasa
Democratic Republic of the Congo women's footballers
Women's association football goalkeepers
21st-century Democratic Republic of the Congo people
Democratic Republic of the Congo women's international footballers
Democratic Republic of the Congo expatriate footballers
Democratic Republic of the Congo expatriate sportspeople in Angola
Expatriate women's footballers in Angola
Democratic Republic of the Congo expatriate sportspeople in Turkey
Expatriate women's footballers in Turkey
Turkish Women's Football Super League players
Adana İdmanyurduspor players